Joseph Dale Lansford (born January 15, 1961) is an American former professional baseball player. He played in Major League Baseball (MLB) as a first basemen for the San Diego Padres in 1978 and 1979. He also played nine seasons in the minor league baseball from 1979 to 1987. He is the younger brother of former major league player Carney Lansford.

Lansford was selected 14th overall in the 1979 amateur draft. He made his first Major League appearance on July 31, 1982.

In 1978 as a member of the Anchorage Glacier Pilots Lansford hit a then record distance home run for Mulcahy Stadium, which landed on the 10 yard line of the football field beyond the left field fence.

External links

1961 births
Major League Baseball catchers
Hawaii Islanders players
San Diego Padres players
Walla Walla Padres players
Reno Silver Sox players
Amarillo Gold Sox players
Living people
Baseball players from California
Buffalo Bisons (minor league) players
Las Vegas Stars (baseball) players
Tacoma Tigers players
Anchorage Glacier Pilots players